Transtillaspis anxia is a species of moth of the family Tortricidae. It is found in Colombia.

The length of the forewings is 11 mm. The ground colour of the forewings is brownish cream with brownish suffusions and darker markings. The hindwings are cream, tinged pale brownish in the apical area.

Etymology
The species name refers to a hesitation in identification of the taxon and is derived from anxius (meaning timid).

References

Moths described in 2004
Transtillaspis
Moths of South America
Taxa named by Józef Razowski